

Films

References

Films
2008
2008-related lists